Wilfredo Aramat Rivera Cepeda (born October 14, 2003) is a Puerto Rican footballer who plays as a winger for Major League Soccer club Orlando City and the Puerto Rico national team.

Club career

Youth 
Rivera grew up in the Quintana barrio of San Juan, Puerto Rico and began playing soccer for the Academia Quintana team. His family moved to Florida, United States in 2010 and he joined Clay County Soccer Club. After seven seasons at Clay County SC, Rivera moved to Jacksonville FC before joining the SIMA/Orlando City DA program at Montverde Academy.

Orlando City 
In March 2020, Rivera signed an academy contract with Orlando City B, Orlando City's USL League One affiliate. He made his debut in the season opener on August 1, 2020, starting against South Georgia Tormenta and scored his first goal for the club the following week in a 2–0 victory over New England Revolution II. He started in all 15 games and finished the season as the team's top scorer with three goals.

Having originally committed to playing college soccer for South Florida Bulls beginning fall 2021, Rivera joined the Orlando City senior team's preseason camp ahead of the 2021 season and on March 22, 2021, signed a professional three-year homegrown contract. He became the club's ninth homegrown and second youngest player to sign a first-team contract after Tommy Redding in 2014.

Rivera continued to play for Orlando City B during the inaugural 2022 MLS Next Pro season until July 25, 2022, when he joined USL Championship side Indy Eleven on loan for the remainder of the season.

International 
In September 2018, Rivera was called-up to the United States under-16 training camp.

Rivera made his Puerto Rico under-17 debut in 2019 during 2019 CONCACAF U-17 Championship qualifying and later represented the team during the knockout stage, starting in a 2–1 loss to Mexico in the Round of 16.

On January 19, 2021, he made his senior debut with Puerto Rico as an 80th-minute substitute in a friendly 1–0 win over Dominican Republic.

Career statistics 
As of October 15, 2022

References

External links 
 Profile at Orlando City

2003 births
Living people
Soccer players from Jacksonville, Florida
Sportspeople from San Juan, Puerto Rico
Puerto Rican footballers
Puerto Rico international footballers
Association football forwards
Homegrown Players (MLS)
Indy Eleven players
MLS Next Pro players
Montverde Academy alumni
Orlando City B players
Orlando City SC players
USL Championship players
USL League One players